Ishq Mein Kaafir is a 2018 Pakistani drama serial which aired on A-Plus TV. The drama features Saboor Aly and Gohar Mumtaz and was first aired on 27 August 2018.

Story
The story revolves around black magic and its effects on our lives. Main lead Ujala loves her university fellow Fahad, she wants to marry him, her another dream is to become a qualified doctor. She takes the help of Taweez to fulfil her dreams. On the other hand, Fahad didn’t like her. Fahad was in love with Dua. Ujala wants to get the love of Fahad by hook or crook.

Unfortunately, Ujala gets Fahad and becomes his wife but Fahad likes her but still had feelings for dua, when Fahad learns that Ujala has got him with wrong means of black magic he gets upset and left her and takes her little daughter away from her too. In the end Fahad marries his love Dua and Ujala who was using wrong means to get her love,left all alone and depressed.
Moral of the story is that, nobody can gain anything with wrong doings and unfair means of Black magic.

Cast
 Saboor Aly as Ujala
 Gohar Mumtaz as Fahad
 Saba Faisal as Salima
 Mariya Khan
 Sadia Faisal as  Urooj
 Mohsin Gillani as Samiullah
 Waseem Tirmazi as Raza
 Ayesha Khan
 Aymi Khan as Maryiam
 Humayun Gull
 Saima saleem
 Mariam Shafi
 Momina Iqbal as Dua
 Fakhar Zaman
 Syeda Mahreen Shah 
 Ponam Anwar 
 Aitzaz Bajwa 
 Iqra Qaiser
 Iqra Kanwal

References

External links 
Official website 

Pakistani drama television series
2018 Pakistani television series debuts
Urdu-language television shows
A-Plus TV original programming